The following is a list of paintings by the Dutch and Flemish Renaissance painter and printmaker Pieter Bruegel the Elder. These Catalog Numbers correspond to the numbering in Roger Hendrik Marijnissen's book, "Bruegel", with photographs by the Swiss art historian, Max Seidel (New York: Harrison House, 1984).

Sources
 Rainer & Rose-Marie Hagen. Bruegel. Taschen. 1999. 

 Pieter Bruegel the Elder
Bruegel